Befotaka is a village and rural commune in the Mahanoro (district) in the Atsinanana Region, Madagascar.

References

Populated places in Atsinanana